Aubonne is a river in the canton of Vaud, Switzerland. The river flows into Lake Geneva near Aubonne.

References

Rivers of Switzerland
Canton of Vaud